List of events from the year 1509 in France.

Incumbents
 Monarch – Louis XII

Events

 April 15 – The French army under the command of Louis XII leave Milan to invade Venetian territory. Part of the War of the League of Cambrai and the Italian Wars.
 May 9 – Louis XII and his army cross the Adda River at Cassano d'Adda.
 May 14 – Battle of Agnadello: French forces defeat the Venetians. The League of Cambrai occupies Venice's mainland territories.
 July 17 – French forces lose control of the city of Padua to the Venetians.
 August 8 – The French, along with support from the Holy Roman Empire, begin a siege of Padua that would last for months to retake the city.
 October 2 – The siege of Padua ends with Venetian victory, causing the retreat of HRE and French forces back to Tyrol and Milan.
 Aft. October 2 – French forces lose control of the city of Vicenza to the Venetians.

Births 

 July 10 – John Calvin, theologian, principal developer of the system later called Calvinism (d. 1564)
 August 3 – Étienne Dolet, scholar and printer (d. 1546)

Date unknown 
 Antonio Gardano, composer (d. 1569)
 Élie Vinet, humanist (d. 1587)
 François Douaren, jurist (d. 1559)
 François de Scépeaux, governor (d. 1571)
 Gaspard de Saulx, military leader (d. 1573)
 Guillaume Le Testu, privateer (d. 1573)
 Valérand Poullain, Calvinist minister (d. 1557)

Deaths

Date unknown 
 Nephew of Philippe de Luxembourg (b. unknown)

References

See also

1500s in France